Zapol Glacier is a steep valley glacier draining the west slope of Vinson Massif south of Silverstein Peak and Príncipe de Asturias Peak, and descending between Tulaczyk Glacier and Donnellan Glacier in the Sentinel Range, Antarctica. The glacier flows southwestward and leaving the range joins Nimitz Glacier south of Hodges Knoll.

It was named by US-ACAN (2006) after Dr. Warren M. Zapol, Department of Anesthesia, Massachusetts General Hospital, whose long-term research near McMurdo Station on diving physiology of Weddell seals (begun mid-1970s) was part of a larger effort to understand how gas is handled in mammals as part of a search to understand SIDS (Sudden Infant Death Syndrome).

See also
 List of glaciers in the Antarctic
 Glaciology

Maps
 Vinson Massif.  Scale 1:250 000 topographic map.  Reston, Virginia: US Geological Survey, 1988.
 Antarctic Digital Database (ADD). Scale 1:250000 topographic map of Antarctica. Scientific Committee on Antarctic Research (SCAR). Since 1993, regularly updated.

External links
 Zapol Glacier. SCAR Composite Antarctic Gazetteer

Glaciers of Ellsworth Land